Harold Calvin Marston Morse (March 24, 1892 – June 22, 1977) was an American mathematician best known for his work on the calculus of variations in the large, a subject where he introduced the technique of differential topology now known as Morse theory. The Morse–Palais lemma, one of the key results in Morse theory, is named after him, as is the Thue–Morse sequence, an infinite binary sequence with many applications. In 1933 he was awarded the Bôcher Memorial Prize for his work in mathematical analysis.

Biography
He was born in Waterville, Maine to Ella Phoebe Marston and Howard Calvin Morse in 1892. He received his bachelor's degree from Colby College (also in Waterville) in 1914. At Harvard University, he received both his master's degree in 1915 and his PhD in 1917. He wrote his PhD thesis, Certain Types of Geodesic Motion of a Surface of Negative Curvature, under the direction of George David Birkhoff.

Morse was a Benjamin Peirce Instructor at Harvard in 1919–1920, after which he served as an assistant professor at Cornell University from 1920 to 1925 and at Brown University in 1925–1926. He returned to Harvard in 1926, advancing to professor in 1929, and teaching there until 1935. That year, he accepted a position at the Institute for Advanced Study in Princeton, where he remained until his retirement in 1962.

He spent most of his career on a single subject, now known as Morse theory, a branch of differential topology that enables one to analyze the topology of a smooth manifold by studying differentiable functions on that manifold. Morse originally applied his theory to geodesics (critical points of the energy functional on paths); these techniques were used in Raoul Bott's proof of his periodicity theorem. Morse theory is a very important subject in modern mathematical physics, such as string theory.

He died on June 22, 1977, at his home in Princeton, New Jersey.

Marston Morse should not be confused with either his 5th cousin twice removed Samuel Morse, famous for Morse code, nor Anthony Morse, famous for the Morse–Sard theorem.

Selected publications

Articles

Books
 
 
 
 
 with Stewart Cairns:

Film
 "Pits, Peaks, and Passes: A Lecture on Critical Point Theory", Mathematical Association of America Lecture Films, 1966

Notes

Biographical references
 .

References
 .
 .

1892 births
1977 deaths
20th-century American mathematicians
Colby College alumni
Cornell University faculty
Differential geometers
Harvard University alumni
Harvard University faculty
Institute for Advanced Study faculty
People from Waterville, Maine
Princeton University faculty
Brown University faculty
Topologists
National Medal of Science laureates
Presidents of the American Mathematical Society
Variational analysts
Mathematicians from Maine
Members of the United States National Academy of Sciences